is a video game developed by Nintendo, and released in arcades in September 1980 by Nintendo. Some sources claim that Ikegami Tsushinki also did design work on Heli Fire.  Similar to the 1980 Taito title Polaris, players control a submarine in which they must survive as long as possible against a barrage of enemy attacks from the sea and above.

Heli Fire came in both upright and cocktail arcade cabinets. It featured color raster graphics utilizing a Sanyo 20-DZC monitor. The game could be played with one player or two players who alternate turns. The sound was provided by Hirokazu Tanaka, and it consisted of one amplified monoural channel.

Gameplay

The submarine can move in eight directions and can defend itself with missiles. While ships and mines attack the submarine from the water, enemy helicopters, which come in four different colors that designate their speed, drop missiles and depth charges at the submarine from the air. Each level consists of three sets of ten helicopters (for a total of 30) which must be destroyed within a specified time limit, or else they start to attack in a "special assault pattern". After a certain number of helicopters are destroyed, the submarine resurfaces, and a native girl dances (called "dancers of the isles") on top of the submarine while bonus points are awarded. After each level, the water level rises, placing the submarine closer to the helicopters and underwater traps.

Reception
According to Florent Gorges' book The History of Nintendo, Heli Fire, "for once, really put the players' skills to the test"; he explained that players had to dodge attacks from the air as well as pay attention to what is in the water in order to avoid ships and mines. The Killer List of Videogames website listed the game as one of the rarest machines amongst the members of the Video Arcade Preservation Society.

Notes

References

1980 video games
Arcade video games
Arcade-only video games
Naval video games
Nintendo arcade games
Nintendo games
Nintendo Research & Development 1 games
Submarine simulation video games
Video games developed in Japan
Video games scored by Hirokazu Tanaka